Dennis the Menace may refer to either of two comic strip characters that both appeared in March 1951, one in the UK and one in the US.

Scottish character
 Dennis the Menace (DC Thomson publishing company)(written and published from Dundee Scotland) is the original title of a Scottish comic strip which first appeared in The Beano 30 July 1938 and became the longest running comic issued weekly in 2018, publishing its 4000th issue in August 2019 ;
Various television adaptations of the comic strip:
Dennis the Menace and Gnasher (1996 TV series) is an animated television series based on the Beano comic strip, known internationally as Dennis and Gnasher.
Dennis the Menace and Gnasher (2009 TV series) was released on September 7, 2009.
Dennis & Gnasher: Unleashed! (2017 TV series) is the latest animated CGI series, first broadcast in November 2017. A Second series has subsequently been made.

American character
 Dennis the Menace (U.S. comics), a daily US syndicated newspaper comic strip since March 12, 1951
Various television and film adaptations of the comic strip:
Dennis the Menace (1959 TV series), a CBS network live action television show 
Dennis the Menace (1986 TV series), an animated TV series
Dennis the Menace (1987 film), a made-for-television live action film released in 1987; a.k.a. Dennis the Menace: Dinosaur Hunter
All-New Dennis the Menace, a 1993 animated television series
Dennis the Menace (1993 film), a live-action film released in 1993
Dennis the Menace (video game), based on the 1993 film
Dennis the Menace Strikes Again, a 1998 direct-to-video sequel of the 1993 film
 Dennis the Menace in Cruise Control (2002, animated)
A Dennis the Menace Christmas, a 2007 direct-to-video sequel of the 1993 film

Other
Storm Dennis in the UK in 2020